Novinki is a rural locality (a village) in Pekshinskoye Rural Settlement, Petushinsky District, Vladimir Oblast, Russia. The population was 32 as of 2010.

Geography 
Novinki is located 19 km east of Petushki (the district's administrative centre) by road. Kosteryovo is the nearest rural locality.

References 

Rural localities in Petushinsky District